The McLaren MP4/11 was the car with which the McLaren team competed in the 1996 Formula One World Championship. The chassis was designed by Neil Oatley, Steve Nichols, Matthew Jeffreys, David North, David Neilson, Paddy Lowe and Henri Durand, with Mario Illien designing the bespoke Ilmor engine. It was driven by Finn Mika Häkkinen, who was in his third full season with the team, and Briton David Coulthard, who moved from Williams.

Overview

Background 
The second year of the arrangement was to be far more productive with both performance and reliability improved, but the team had yet to make the serious breakthrough necessary to challenge the "big three" of Williams, Ferrari and Benetton.

Pre-season testing 
In pre-season testing, which took place at Estoril in February 1996 and Silverstone in March, four-times world champion Alain Prost was brought in as a technical advisor to test-drive the MP4/11 in Häkkinen's absence, who was still recovering from his near-fatal crash during qualifying for the 1995 Australian Grand Prix.

Racing history 

The car's best result came in Monaco, with Coulthard finishing a close second to Olivier Panis' Ligier at the end of a chaotic race. However, Coulthard was outscored and generally outpaced by his teammate.

The car was developed throughout the season, with improvements initiated to eradicate an initial handling imbalance in time for Coulthard to lead the first 19 laps in San Marino.  On the MP4/10, a small additional wing was mounted on the engine cover, but this was removed in mid-1995.  The wing was brought back for the MP4/11 in Monaco, and was also used at Hungary.  A "B" version of the chassis was developed for Silverstone, and Häkkinen responded with four podium finishes from then until the end of the season.

1996 was also notable for McLaren losing its long-term Marlboro sponsorship at the end of the season, but the team responded by recruiting rival German tobacco brand West, who had previously (1985–89) been the major sponsor of the small German Zakspeed team.

The team eventually finished fourth in the Constructors' Championship, with 49 points.

Complete Formula One results
(key) (results in bold indicate pole position)

References

McLaren Formula One cars
1996 Formula One season cars